Ismael Alicea (1954-2015) was a librarian, particularly well known for his work at the New York Public Library. Alicea held many positions in the library over 36 years, starting as a clerk in 1971.  He received a Master of Library and Information Science in 1982 and served as a librarian for many libraries in the Bronx.  When he retired, Alicea was the associate director of adult education and outreach for the library.  During his time at the library, Alicea collaborated with colleagues to compile several major bibliographies.

Alicea was also active in the Northeast chapter of REFORMA.  This chapter established an award in his honor for members who are committed to serving the Latino community.

See also
List of Puerto Ricans

References

1954 births
2015 deaths
American librarians
People from Adjuntas, Puerto Rico
Hispanic and Latino American librarians
American bibliographers